Überseequartier is a station on the Hamburg U-Bahn line U4. The station was opened in November 2012 and is located in the Hamburg quarter of HafenCity, Germany. HafenCity is part of the borough of Hamburg-Mitte. The station code is "UR".

Architecture and Art 
The stop was designed by the Netzwerkarchitekten architecture studio from Darmstadt. The walls are clad in blue ceramic-coated glass tiles that get darker the further down they go, recalling the undersea world. Silver-colored plates on the ceiling give the impression of a water surface. This underwater theme ties in nicely with the fact that the neighborhood is next to the harbor, and with the name of the stop, which translates as "Overseas Quarter", where the overseas part would provide the seafaring theme, and a playful interpretation of "over-seas" could see the neighborhood as over the sea and the metro station as below it and hence underwater...

The underwater impression is heightened by a sound installation where speakers broadcast underwater sounds such as waves and other marine noises, acoustically amplifying the visual impression.

In a showcase on the platform, on permanent loan from the Hamburg International Maritime Museum, is a 1:100-scale model of the Queen Elizabeth 2 (a British passenger ship that ran from 1969 to 2008), built by Günther Nitz.

Service

Trains 
Überseequartier is served by Hamburg U-Bahn line U4; departures are every 5 minutes.

Gallery

See also 

 List of Hamburg U-Bahn stations

References

External links 

 Line and route network plans by hvv.de 

Hamburg U-Bahn stations in Hamburg
Buildings and structures in Hamburg-Mitte
U4 (Hamburg U-Bahn) stations
Railway stations in Germany opened in 2012